Daniel Alonso Aceves Patiño (born 28 March 2001) is a Mexican professional footballer who plays as a left-back for Major League Soccer club Chicago Fire, on loan from Liga MX side Pachuca.

Club career

Pachuca
Aceves joined Pachuca's youth academy in 2016. On 7 November 2020, under manager Paulo Pezzolano, he made his professional debut in Liga MX against Necaxa ending in a 1–0 defeat.

Oviedo (loan)
On 17 July 2022, Aceves joined Segunda División club Real Oviedo on a season-long loan. He made his debut with the club on 15 August 2022, against FC Andorra in a 1–0 loss.

International career
Aceves was called up by Raúl Chabrand to participate with the under-21 team at the 2022 Maurice Revello Tournament, where Mexico finished the tournament in third place.

Career statistics

Club

References

External links
 
 

Living people
2001 births
Association football defenders
Mexico youth international footballers
Mexican expatriate footballers
Liga MX players
Segunda División players
C.F. Pachuca players
Real Oviedo players
Chicago Fire FC players
Footballers from the State of Mexico
Mexican footballers